Cochylimorpha nomadana is a species of moth of the family Tortricidae. It is found in China (Xinjiang), Afghanistan, Iran, Russia (the Caucasus and south-eastern part of European Russia), Armenia, Kazakhstan, Turkmenistan and Uzbekistan.

The wingspan is 22–31 mm. Adults have been recorded from wing from July to August.

References

Moths described in 1874
Cochylimorpha
Moths of Asia